Christos Albanis (born 5 November 1994) is a Greek professional footballer who plays as a winger for Segunda División club Andorra.

Career

Early career
Born in Kalabaka, Trikala, Greece, Albanis started his career at Meteora, the team of his native town. At the age of 16 he moved to Germany, joining Werder Bremen's U17 team. He later went on to play for the club's U19 team before playing for Eintracht Frankfurt II and SC Freiburg II.

Apollon Smyrnis
On 31 August 2015, Apollon Smyrnis announced the signing of Albanis on a two-year deal. During the first season he did not get much first team action. In the 2016–17 season he was one of the most important players, as his team won the league title and gained promotion to the Super League. He scored 9 goals and provided his teammates with 6 assists. His performances attracted the interest of Super League side, Panionios, but Apollon Smyrnis' administration moved quickly and extended his contract by two additional years.

On 22 October 2017, he scored his first Super League goal in a 2–0 home win against Xanthi, which was also his first for the 2017–18 season. A week later, he scored the equalizer in a 1–1 away draw against Panetolikos. A further week later, he scored in a third successive match, a 4–3 home win against PAS Giannina. On 10 December 2017 he scored in the early minutes of the second half, but Apollon didn't avoid a 3–1 home loss. On 1 April 2018, he scored a brace in a 3–0 home win game against AEL in his club's effort to avoid relegation. On 22 April 2018, Albanis’ strike in the opening minute of a tense match at the Georgios Kamaras Stadium against champions Olympiacos was enough to seal three vital points for the home side, and are now assured of Super League next season as a result.

AEK Athens
In May 2018, Apollon Smyrnis announced the transfer of Albanis to AEK Athens. Apollon Smyrnis secured a resale rate of 20%.
On 14 August 2018, he made his international debut in a 2–1 home win UEFA Champions League Third qualifying round, 2nd leg game against Celtic as a late substitute.
On 17 March 2019, came off the bench to score a superb late goal which earned AEK Athens a narrow 1–0 away win over rivals Atromitos as AEK Athens cemented their grip on third place. It was his first goal with the club in all competitions.

On 22 January 2020, he scored his first goal for the season, by collecting a stray pass from an opponent in the area, and slid his effort under the goalkeeper in a 3–1 away win against Volos.
On 16 February 2020, Albanis scored the only goal of the game as AEK Athens triumphed 1–0 against Aris at the Kleanthis Vikelidis Stadium in Thessaloniki, and three days later he scored in a 4–0 home Greek Cup win game against Panetolikos.

On 7 January 2021, he signed a contract extension, until the summer of 2024. On 15 February 2021, he scored in a 4–2 away win against AEL. It was his first of the season. On 18 April 2021, Albanis sealed a 3–1 home win against Asteras Tripolis.

On 1 September 2021, Apollon Limassol announces the agreement with AEK for the transfer on a long-season loan until May 2022. Exactly one year later, he switched teams and countries again after agreeing to a one-year loan deal with Segunda División side FC Andorra.

On 3 February 2023, Albanis joined FC Andorra on permanent basis.

Career statistics

Honours
Apollon Limassol
Cypriot First Division: 2021–22

References

External links

1994 births
Living people
Greek footballers
Greece under-21 international footballers
Greece youth international footballers
Association football forwards
Regionalliga players
Super League Greece players
Football League (Greece) players
Cypriot First Division players
Segunda División players
Apollon Smyrnis F.C. players
AEK Athens F.C. players
Apollon Limassol FC players
FC Andorra players
People from Kalabaka
Footballers from Thessaly
Greek expatriate footballers
Greek expatriate sportspeople in Germany
Greek expatriate sportspeople in Cyprus
Greek expatriate sportspeople in Spain
Expatriate footballers in Germany
Expatriate footballers in Cyprus
Expatriate footballers in Spain